"Moonlight Mile" is a song recorded by the Rolling Stones. Written by Mick Jagger and Keith Richards, it appears as the closing track on their 1971 album Sticky Fingers. The song features multiple musicians playing alternate instruments due to the frequent absence of Richards during recording sessions of the period.

"Moonlight Mile" has been largely considered an under-appreciated work of the band, with music critics Bill Janovitz and Robert Christgau praising the track's composition.

Recording and composition
"Moonlight Mile" was the last song recorded for Sticky Fingers. Recording took place during the end of October 1970 at Stargroves. The song was the product of an all-night session between Jagger and guitarist Mick Taylor. Taylor had taken a short guitar piece recorded by Jagger (entitled "Japanese Thing") and reworked it for the session. Jagger performs the song's prominent acoustic guitar riff. Jagger felt it easier to extemporize with Taylor, as Richards was not present. It was Taylor's idea to add a string arrangement by Paul Buckmaster to the song. Jim Pricethe Rolling Stones' usual trumpeterplays piano. Taylor claims he was promised some songwriting credit, but found himself surprised that he did not when the song was released on Sticky Fingers. Richards and Jagger took credit for the song.

The lyrics are elliptical and mysterious, but touch on the alienation of life on the road:

Reception
Many consider "Moonlight Mile" one of the Rolling Stones' most under-appreciated ballads. In a review of the song, Bill Janovitz says, "Though the song still referenced drugs and the road life of a pop-music celebrity, it really is a rare example of Jagger letting go of his public persona, offering a behind-the-scenes glimpse of the weariness that accompanies the pressures of keeping up appearances as a sex-drugs-and-rock & roll star."

Rock critic Robert Christgau said the song, "re-created all the paradoxical distances inherent in erotic love with a power worthy of Yeats, yet could also be interpreted as a cocaine song." This is a reference to the first stanza, which includes, "When the wind blows and the rain feels cold, With a head full of snow". It was meant to be about coming down from a cocaine high. However, Mick Jagger later dismissed any suggestions of the song being an allegory for drug use, and stated "The feeling I had at that moment was how difficult it was to be touring and how I wasn’t looking forward to going out and doing it again. It’s a very lonely thing, and my lyrics reflected that".

Writing for Slate, pop critic Jack Hamilton praised the track, referring to it as Sticky Fingers' "strangest and most unique recording" that is "an intoxicating mix of exotic and intimate".

Personnel
 Mick Jaggervocals, acoustic guitar
 Mick Taylorlead guitar
 Bill Wymanbass guitar
 Charlie Wattsdrums
 Jim Pricepiano
 Paul Buckmasterstring arrangement

References

The Rolling Stones songs
1971 songs
Songs written by Jagger–Richards
Song recordings produced by Jimmy Miller
Rock ballads
British soul songs
Songs about drugs